Donatella Raffai (8 September 1943 – 10 February 2022) was an Italian radio and television writer and presenter.

Life and career 
Born in Fabriano on 8 September 1943, Raffai started her career as a public relations manager for RCA and as an image consultant for several singers, notably Mia Martini and Nada. 

In 1971 she debuted as a radio presenter, and she made her television debut in 1980, with the show Chi ci invita?. In the following years she presented several programs, until her last work, Giallo 4'', that she wrote and hosted between 1999 and 2000 on Rete 4. 

Raffai died after a long illness on 10 February 2022, at the age of 78.

References

External links 
 

1943 births
2022 deaths
Italian radio presenters
Italian women radio presenters
Italian television presenters
Italian women television presenters
Italian television writers
People from Fabriano